Buccinaria loochooensis is a species of sea snail, a marine gastropod mollusk in the family Raphitomidae.

Description
The length of the shell attains 29.7 mm, its diameter 12.6 mm.

Distribution
This species was originally described from Neogene strata in the Ryukyu Islands, later from Pliocene strata in Okinawa. Recent specimens were found off Borneo, Luzon Island, the Philippines  and in the Celebes Sea, Indonesia.

References

 Bouchet P. & Sysoev A. (1997) Revision of the Recent species of Buccinaria (Gastropoda: Conoidea), a genus of deep-water turrids of Tethyan origin. Venus, Japanese Journal of Malacology, 56:93-119

External links
 MNHN, Paris: specimen

loochooensis
Gastropods described in 1961